Mitsuru Maruoka (born 6 January 1996) is a Japanese professional footballer who plays as a midfielder for Liga 1 club RANS Nusantara.

Club career
Maruoka joined Borussia Dortmund in January 2014 on a one and a half year loan from Cerezo Osaka. He made his professional debut in the 3. Liga with the club's reserve team on 25 January 2014 against SpVgg Unterhaching.

Maruoka joined newcomer K League 2 club Gimpo in december 2021 after a season in BG Pathum United.

Personal life
Mitsuru's brother, Satoru plays for ReinMeer Aomori in Japan Football League.

Career statistics

Honours

Club
BG Pathum United
 Thai League 1: 2020–21

References

External links
 Profile at Renofa Yamaguchi
 
 Profile at Cerezo Osaka
 

1996 births
Living people
Association football midfielders
Japanese footballers
Association football people from Tokushima Prefecture
Bundesliga players
3. Liga players
J2 League players
J3 League players
K League 2 players
Mitsuru Maruoka
Liga 1 (Indonesia) players
Mitsuru Maruoka
Borussia Dortmund players
Borussia Dortmund II players
Cerezo Osaka players
Cerezo Osaka U-23 players
V-Varen Nagasaki players
Renofa Yamaguchi FC players
Gimpo FC players
RANS Nusantara F.C. players
Japanese expatriate footballers
Japanese expatriate sportspeople in Germany
Expatriate footballers in Germany
Japanese expatriate sportspeople in Thailand
Expatriate footballers in Indonesia
Japanese expatriate sportspeople in Indonesia